Empress Xiao mu cheng (1781 – 17 February 1808), of the Manchu Bordered Yellow Banner Niohuru clan, was a consort of the Daoguang Emperor.

Life

Family background
Empress Xiaomucheng's personal name was not recorded in history.

 Father: Buyandalai (d. 1801), served as the Minister of Revenue from 1799–1801, and held the title of a third class duke
 Paternal grandfather: Arigūn (d. 1769), Ebilun's grandson
 Paternal great uncle: Necin (讷亲; d. 1749), served as Minister of War until 1749
 Paternal uncle: Fengsheng'e （丰昇额,d.1777), served as the  Minister of War in 1770 and  Minister of Revenue in 1773

Jiaqing era
On 22 December 1796, Lady Niohuru married Minning, the second son of the Jiaqing Emperor, and became his primary consort. She died on 17 February 1808 and was interred in the Eastern Qing tombs.

Daoguang era
The Jiaqing Emperor died on 2 September 1820 and was succeeded by Minning, who was enthroned as the Daoguang Emperor. Lady Niohuru was granted the posthumous title "Empress Xiaomu".

In 1828, there was a leak in the Eastern Qing tombs, resulting in flooding. In 1829, Lady Niohuru's casket was temporarily moved to the Baohua Ravine Hall (寶華峪正殿). In 1835, her casket was transferred to the Mu Mausoleum of the Western Qing tombs.

Titles
 During the reign of the Qianlong Emperor (r. 1735–1796):
 Lady Niohuru (from 1781)
 During the reign of the Jiaqing Emperor (r. 1796–1820):
 Primary consort (from 22 December 1796)
 During the reign of the Daoguang Emperor (r. 1820–1850):
 Empress Xiaomu (from 1820)
 During the reign of the Xianfeng Emperor (r. 1850–1861):
 Empress Xiaomucheng (from 26 October 1850)

See also
 Ranks of imperial consorts in China#Qing
 Royal and noble ranks of the Qing dynasty

Notes

References
 
 

1781 births
1808 deaths
Xiaomucheng, Empress
Xiaomucheng, Empress
18th-century Chinese women
18th-century Chinese people
19th-century Chinese women
19th-century Chinese people
Consorts of the Daoguang Emperor